An Ostrich Told Me the World Is Fake and I Think I Believe It is a 2021 Australian stop motion animated short written, directed and animated by student filmmaker Lachlan Pendragon.

Summary
Neil is an office worker, trying and failing to sell toasters from his cubicle, and is threatened with termination by his boss. Gradually, he begins to experience hallucinations of his world being fake, including seeing the blinking green-screen and realizing that some props are missing from his coworkers' cubicles. After falling asleep at work, he wakes up to encounter an ostrich, who confirms that the world is a "sham," and challenges Neil to take a closer look at his surroundings. When investigating a nearby storeroom, Neil falls outside of the stop-motion animation set, where he is retrieved by the creator after finding a prop box full of his own mouths. The next morning, Neil arrives at work and is shocked to find all of the office furniture changed. A coworker, Gaven, claims that it had been a decision by corporate, but Neil, remembering the ostrich's words, is convinced that it's a sign that their world is fake. He returns to the storeroom, but is shocked to find it full of ordinary furniture. Desperate to prove his point, he successfully rips off Gaven's mouth, which breaks the world and leads the creator to intervene. Neil escapes the creator's hand and falls off the set again, breaking into many pieces near an outlet, where he stops moving. The creator then works at their computer, where it's revealed that Neil and all of his coworkers are merely figures in a stop-motion commercial advertising upgraded office furniture, with an ostrich as the company mascot. Neil's broken body is retrieved and thrown into a box of "broken bits," before being replaced by a one of many identical Neil figurines. Neil then wakes up at his desk, and after being confronted by his boss due to his poor performance, he abruptly quits.

Voice cast 
 Lachlan Pendragon as Neil
 John Cavanagh as The Ostrich
 Michael Richard as Bill the Boss
 Jamie Trotter as Gaven

Accolades
The short was honoured at the Student Academy Awards in 2022.

It was nominated for the Best Animated Short Academy Award in 2023.

Won Best Film and Best Cinematography at the Stellar Short Film Festival in 2023.

See also
 Postmodernist film

References

External links 
 

Australian animated short films
2020s animated short films
Films set in offices
Stop-motion animated short films
Self-reflexive films
Griffith Film School